Zehr-e-Ishq is a Pakistani romantic musical film released in 1958. Following Intezaar, Zehr-e-Ishq is the second film featuring Masood Parvez as a director, Khwaja Khurshid Anwar as a producer, music composer and writer, Qateel Shifai as a lyricist, and Syed Imtiaz Ali Taj as a screenwriter. Musarrat Nazir, Habib ur Rehman and Yasmin appeared in lead roles in the film.

Plot 

Sanwali belongs to a Sapera tribe and is madly in love with Jamil. But Jamil's mother is against this relationship and fixes Jamil's engagement with his cousin Salma, against his wish. Sanwali's father too tries to marry her with someone but she doesn't allow him to do. She plans to marry him by fleeing off from house but fails as his father locks her in the room. He marries her with a guy of their tribe by intoxicating her.

When Sanwali does not reach there, Jamil considers her as a disloyal and marries Salam. On his marriage, Sanwali's sister Ratti tells him what happened to her. He then falls ill due to restlessness but recovers later when Sanwali comes to him after killing her husband by pushing from the hill. She then threatens Salam to leave Jamil, to which she decides to leave him for his happiness. On leaving his house, she meets with an accidental and her face bruns completely. She denies her secretary to tell anybody about her survival.

Jamil marries Sanwali and starts living with her, leaving his mother and his son from Salma alone. He tries to convince Sanwali to adopt his son to which she first denies but later accepts on the insistence of her sister and father. He goes to bring his son but his mother refuses flatly which saddens him in his memory. For the sake of his happiness, one day Sawanli  secretly goes to his mother's house where she catches her. They both argue there and end up on quarrel when Jamil's mother falls and dies. She then brings the child to her house to Jamil.

On observing, Jamil's increasing affection for his son she decides to kill him by falling him from the mountain but changes his decesion when the child calls her by saying "mother". The child then Suffers from pneumonia and Salma comes to see him one night, who keeps coming to see her son even before. Sanwali catches her and suggests her to take him with her. But she then recognizes her, and decides to kill her son. She just starts to poison him when the child calls her "mother", she stops and drinks the poison herself.

Cast 

 Musarrat Nazir — as Sanwali
 Habib-ur-Rehman – as Jamil
 Yasmin – as Salma
 Bibbo – as Jamil's mother
 Nusrat Kardar
 Neelo – as Ratti, Sanwali's sister
 M. Ismail – as Salma's secretary 
 Sultan Rahi (extra)

Release 

Zehr-e-Ishq was released on 21 April 1958 in Karachi cinemas but couldn't perform well at the box office.

Soundtrack

Awards 
The film won four Nigar Awards in the following categories:

References

External links 

 

Urdu-language Pakistani films
Pakistani black-and-white films
1950s Urdu-language films
Films directed by Masood Parvez